Western Placer Unified School District is a unified school district based in the Placer County city of Lincoln, California. The district is composed of seven elementary schools, two middle schools, and two high schools.

References

School districts in Placer County, California